Dorcasiidae is a family of air-breathing land snails, terrestrial pulmonate gastropod mollusks in the superfamily Acavoidea (according to the taxonomy of the Gastropoda by Bouchet & Rocroi, 2005).

The family Dorcasiidae has no subfamilies.

Distribution 
Found in southern Africa.

Genera
Genera within the family Dorcasiidae include:
 Dorcasia Gray, 1838 - the type genus of the family Dorcasiidae
 Trigonephrus Pilsbry, 1905
 Tulbaghinia Melvill & Ponsonby, 1898

References

External links 

 images